All the Right Noises is the thirteenth studio album by English hard rock band Thunder, released on 12 March 2021 through BMG Rights Management. The band promoted the album with an online live special broadcast on 13 March 2021, and are scheduled to support the album with a tour of the UK from May 2021.

Cover art
The album cover is a photograph of the Singing Ringing Tree sculpture in Lancashire, England, which guitarist Luke Morley found after Googling "bizarre musical instruments" for inspiration.

Commercial performance
All the Right Noises placed at number three on the UK Albums Chart and achieved top 10 status in Germany and Switzerland.

Track listing

Charts

References

2021 albums
BMG Rights Management albums
Thunder (band) albums